The Council of Military Education Committees of the Universities of the United Kingdom (COMEC) represents the interests of Military Education Committees in negotiations with Defence and the Armed Forces over policy development in officer training, the University Service Units and the Reserve Forces.  COMEC organizes an Annual Conference, publishes Occasional Papers and awards a Prize to the Officer Cadet who demonstrates outstanding achievement in leadership through military expertise, public service commitment and Service Unit activities.

The COMEC Conspectus publicises to COMEC's strategic allies and others what COMEC does and for whom.

History

COMEC as such came into being in 1919, though its origins lie in the formation of the Officers Training Corps (OTC) in 1908.

Widespread myth surrounds the formation of the OTC, occasioned by a history of the Victorian Volunteers which suggested, in an appendix, that all university Volunteer units transferred to the OTC on 1 September 1908. In fact, only eight universities formed OTCs in that year, although others would soon follow.

Army Order 297 issued on 10 November, officially recognised the first OTC Contingents as Edinburgh with Infantry, Artillery and Medical Units, Birmingham, Cambridge, Durham, Manchester, Oxford and Wales with Infantry Units, and newly- formed Belfast. Edinburgh’s Medical Unit had attended annual camp in August wearing OTC insignia and this gives rise to their optimistic claim to have been the founding OTC Contingent.

The role of the OTC was primarily to prepare undergraduates for commissioned service and to maintain a supply of well-educated officers to the Territorial Force.
No one could have foreseen how vital this was to become when, in the early months of WW1, OTCs bore the brunt of training the large number of additional officers urgently required for the New Army.

From 1908, it was a statutory requirement that a host university had a 'Military Education Committee' (MEC - the usual but not universal title) comprising a mix of university and service representatives to oversee the operation of the OTC with particular regard to the balance between cadets' military and academic activities. Most universities that had Volunteer Companies or Batteries, already had a 'Military Committee' for that very purpose and merely had to adopt the new title.

During World War I, several aspects of the mobilisation, notably the treatment of OTC officers and cadets who enlisted for active service, had caused widespread dissatisfaction within OTCs: officers were treated as substantive 2nd Lieutenants regardless of their Territorial Force rank and cadets arriving at an Officer Cadet Battalion were treated as fresh recruits even if they held Certificate B.

To address this, and other issues, a meeting was held in Durham on 22–23 September 1919, attended by twenty-eight representatives from fifteen MECs and a representative from the War Office. At this meeting, it was resolved to form a ‘Central Organization of Military Education Committees’. COMEC was born.

Its functions were to be:
 To assist in the co-ordination of the work of the Universities and University Colleges in the study of National Defence.
 To secure for Military Science its due place among University studies and to promote the systematic instruction and training of candidates for commissions and, so far as may be desired by the Army Council and other authorities concerned, of Officers in the National Forces.
 For these purposes the Central Organization shall assist in the co-operation of the Universities and University Colleges with the Departments of State which administer the National Forces.

In broad terms, COMEC continued to function as envisaged in 1919 although its role expanded as University Air Squadrons were formed at Cambridge and Oxford in 1925 and many other universities in 1941 and later. University Royal Navy Units also came into being, starting with Aberdeen in 1967.

A significant change came in 1970 when the name was changed to ‘Council of Military Education Committees of the Universities of the United Kingdom’ in an effort to underline the fact that it was an advisory and co-ordinating body, rather than having an executive role.

By the end of the century, COMEC’s ‘Terms of Reference’ had evolved to:
 To co-ordinate and represent the views of MECs to the Ministry of Defence through the directorates for university service units of the Royal Navy, the Army and the Royal Air Force.
 To consider and deliberate upon matters of policy emanating from the directors of university service units and to advise the MOD DRFC and universities thereon.
 To assist in the co-ordination of the work of universities through their MECs and in particular to facilitate systematic instruction and training of candidates for commissions in the armed services as may be required by the MOD and to promote for these purposes the co-operation of the universities with the Ministry of Defence.
 To maintain liaison with the appropriate bodies concerned with Defence Studies and other relevant issues.

The role of COMEC continues in this vein to the present day.

Members

President
2017 on  General Sir Peter Wall GCB CBE DL, former Chief of the General Staff

2011 - 2017  General Sir Mike Jackson GCB CBE DSO DL, former Chief of the General Staff

2006 - 2011  Sir Graeme Davies FRSE FREng, Vice-Chancellor of the University of London

1999 - 2006  Field Marshal The Lord Vincent of Coleshill GBE KCB DSO, former Chief of the Defence Staff

Military Education Committees (MECs)
The University Service Units have their origins in the Army reforms of Richard Haldane, Secretary of State for War, from 1905 to 1908.  In the Territorial and Reserve Forces Act of 1907, the Universities were invited to establish Officers’ Training Corps on the stipulation that they must have a Committee responsible for Military Education.

University Service Units (USUs)

University Royal Naval Units (URNUs)

MECs facilitated the establishment during the Second World War of the University Naval Division, which vanished with the end of war, not to be resurrected for another quarter of a century as the Royal Naval Unit in 1967.

University Officers' Training Corps (UOTCs)

UOTCs were inaugurated from 1908 onwards.

University Air Squadrons (UASs)

University Air Squadrons were created at Cambridge and Oxford in 1925 and at London in 1935, but all were closed down with the outbreak of war in 1939.  MECs sponsored in 1941 the inauguration of the national scheme for establishing Air Squadrons in Universities.

Defence Technical Undergraduate Scheme (DTUS)

The Defence Technical Officer Engineering Entry Scheme (DTOEES) provides education and support to students preparing for a career as an engineer or technical officer in the Armed Forces or MOD Civil Service.  Students attend Welbeck Defence Sixth Form College (DSFC) and, on completion of their A levels, go on to study for an engineering, technical, business or logistics degree at one of the DTUS partner universities.
Defence has closed DTOEES, with the final cohort leaving the Defence Sixth Form College in 2021.

Defence Technical Undergraduate Scheme (DTUS) universities have separate partnership agreements with the Ministry of Defence to educate and support students from Welbeck attending selected degree courses in a range of subjects preparing for a career as a technical officer or engineer in the Armed Forces or Ministry of Defence.  Students belong to a support Squadron which is responsible for their leadership development, mentorship, administration and monitoring their academic progress.
Defence has closed the Scheme, with the final entry of Defence bursars in the DTUS Squadrons being in 2021.

Chairman
1919 - 1921  Prof. Thomas Frederick Tout (Manchester MEC)
1921 - 1926  Prof. Thomas Hudson Beare DL (Edinburgh MEC)
1926 - 1936  Prof. Dudley J Medley (Glasgow MEC)
1936 - 1946  Prof. J A Nixon CMG (Bristol MEC)
1946 - 1953  Col. S J Worsley DSO MC TD (London MEC)
1953 - 1959  Brig. Sir Alick Buchanan-Smith CBE TD JP DL (Edinburgh MEC)
1959 - 1963  Prof. John Thomas Whetton DSO OBE MC TD (Leeds MEAC)
1963 - 1968  Brig. Thomas Rice Henn CBE (Cambridge MEC)
1968 - 1982  Prof. Cecil Howard Tonge TD (Northumbrian MEC)
1982 - 1989  Prof. Malcolm N Naylor RD DL (London MEC)
1989 - 1996  Col. Alan C Roberts MBE TD DL (Leeds MEC)
1996 - 2000  Prof. Michael P Furmston TD (Bristol MEC)
2000 - 2004  Mr. Shane Guy AE (London MEC)
2004 - 2012  Prof. Donald A Ritchie CBE DL (Liverpool MEC)
2012 - 2016  Prof. Dick R Clements MBE (Bristol MEC)
2016 - 2020  Mr. Roderick G Livingston (Glasgow and Strathclyde MEC)
2020 - on.     Mr James Castle (Glasgow and Strathclyde MEC)

Occasional Papers
No. 1:  University Service Units.  What are they really for? by Dr. Patrick Mileham, 2012
No. 2:  The Conundrum of Leadership - Leadership in Government, Foreign Affairs, Defence and Society by Lord Owen, 2013
No. 3:  Leadership in Future Force 2020 by General Sir Richard Barrons, 2014
No. 4:  University Officers’ Training Corps and the First World War by Edward M. Spiers, 2014
No. 5:  Reshaping the British Nuclear Deterrent by Lord David Owen, 2015
No. 6:  Britain's Maritime Future by Jeremy Blackham and Andrew Lambert, 2015
No. 7:  The University Air Squadrons.  Early Years 1920-39 by Clive Richards, 2016
No. 8:  Air Power by Michael Graydon and Andrew Lambert, 2018
No. 9:  War in Peacetime.  Ambiguous Warfare and the Resurgence of the Russian Military by Christopher Donnelly, 2017
No. 10:  COMEC Rejoinder.  The Value of the University Armed Service Units by Dr. Patrick Mileham, 2017
No. 11:  Trustworthiness in Public Life by Onora O’Neill, and National Resilience and the Developing Civil-Military Relationship by David Omand, 2018
No. 12: Ethics of Fighting Power by Dr. Patrick Mileham, 2020

References

External links 

 COMEC website

Educational institutions established in 1919
Higher education organisations based in the United Kingdom
Military education and training in the United Kingdom
Military units and formations established in 1919
University organisations of the British Armed Forces
1919 establishments in the United Kingdom